The Indian state of Meghalaya has a literacy rate of 62.56, according to the census of 2001, and is India's 27th most literate state. This, however, had rapidly increased to 75.5 by 2011.

History
Regular education in Meghalaya began when the Khasi alphabet was proposed in 1842 by the Welsh missionary Thomas Jones. For the Garo Hills area, the Garo alphabet was developed in 1902 by American missionaries. No strict rules required natives of the colonies to be well educated, so only a few primary schools were functioning at the colonial time.

The first college was established in Shillong in 1924 by the Christian Brothers of Ireland. Over the years, several quality colleges and public schools were established at former hill stations. The latter were preferred for education because of their good climate and strong colonial influence.

Universities
 ICFAI University, Meghalaya
 North Eastern Hill University, Shillong
 University of Science and Technology Meghalaya
 University of Technology and Management, Shillong
 Mahatma Gandhi University, Meghalaya
William Carey University, Meghalaya
 The English and Foreign Languages University ,

Autonomous institutions 
 Indian Institute of Management Shillong
 National Institute of Technology Meghalaya
 National Institute of Fashion Technology, Shillong
 North Eastern Indira Gandhi Regional Institute of Health and Medical Sciences
 North Eastern Institute of Ayurveda and Homeopathy

Other
Don Bosco Technical School, Shillong

References 

 
Meghalaya-related lists
Education in Shillong